

0–9

0-9